Robert Gaupset (23 March 1906 – 10 November 1964) was a Norwegian wrestler. He competed in the men's Greco-Roman light heavyweight at the 1928 Summer Olympics.

References

External links
 

1906 births
1964 deaths
Norwegian male sport wrestlers
Olympic wrestlers of Norway
Wrestlers at the 1928 Summer Olympics
Sportspeople from Kristiansund